Ŭnbit station is a railway station in Pugŏ-dong, Paech'ŏn County, South Hwanghae Province, North Korea, on the Paech'ŏn Line of the Korean State Railway.

History
Ŭnbit station was opened by the Korean State Railway in 1971, along with the rest of the Paech'ŏn–Ŭnbit section of the former Tohae Line.

References

Railway stations in North Korea